Hugh Taylor (1817–1900) was a British Conservative Party Member of Parliament, a colliery owner with interests in the shipping industry.

Early life
Hugh Taylor was born in Shilbottle, in Northumberland in 1817. He was partly educated at the Royal Jubilee School, New Road, Newcastle. His first career as a mariner was short-lived and he became a became a partner in a house of coal factors, in London; and, subsequently, in several very extensive collieries in the North of England, including Haswell, Ryhope, Backworth, Holywell, East and West Cramlington, as well as in many mines in South Wales.

Personal life
In 1842, Taylor married Mary, the daughter of Thomas Taylor, of Cramlington Hall.

In 1862 Taylor bought Chipchase Castle which in 2014 is still owned by his decedents.

Political career
In 1852, he successfully contested the borough of Tynemouth for the Conservative party defeating Ralph Gray (the sitting Whig MP) by 12 votes. However it was found his supporters had been bribing the voters and he was duly unseated the following year.

He won the seat in 1859 but it seems his political sympathies were certainly leaning towards the Liberal Party as he voted with them on a number of issues. Hansard records a couple of contributions to maritime debates. He resigned in 1861 and returned to business.

George Hudson
Taylor and George Elliot were both friends of the Railway King George Hudson. By 1869 Hudson was deeply in debt, in bad health and living in exile so Taylor and Elliot started a subscription fund which they launched with donation of 100 Guineas each. When this closed it was converted into a trust fund (legally protected from Hudson's creditors) and provided Hudson with an income. Hudson returned to England in 1870 and visited Taylor at Chipchase Castle in April that year.

References

Notes

1817 births
1900 deaths
UK MPs 1852–1857
UK MPs 1859–1865
Conservative Party (UK) MPs for English constituencies